Kapaldo is a rural town and locality in the North Burnett Region, Queensland, Australia.

Geography 
Anyarro is a neighbourhood in the locality.

The Mungar Junction to Monto railway line enters the locality from the south (Abercorn) and  passes through Anyarro served by the Anyarro railway station in the south-west of the locality before passing through the town of Kapaldo being  served by Kapaldo railway station  and then exiting the locality to the north (Selene). This section of the railway is no long in use and both stations are now abandoned.

The land use is predominantly grazing on native vegetation.

History 
The town derives its name from the Kapaldo railway station, which was named by the Queensland Railways Department on 19 June 1925, based on an Aboriginal word meaning scrubby ground.

Anyarro also takes its name from the Anyarro railway station, which was  named by the railways department 13 June 1925 using an Aboriginal word meaning enough.

Anyarro Provisional School opened in February 1928 and closed in September 1929 due to low student numbers.

Kapaldo State School opened on 1 October 1929 and closed on 1947. It was located on the Anyarro Kapaldo Road (approx ).

Education 
There are no schools in Kapaldo. The nearest government primary schools are Abercorn State School in neighbouring Abercorn to the south and Mulgildie State School in Mulgildie to the north. The nearest government secondary school is Monto State High School in Monto to the north.

References

Further reading 

  — includes Anyarro Provisional School and Kapaldo State School

External links 
  — shows both Anyarro and Kapaldo

Towns in Queensland
North Burnett Region
Localities in Queensland